Myung Mi Kim (born December 6, 1957) is a Korean American poet noted for her postmodern writings. Kim and her family immigrated to the United States when she was nine years old. She holds a Masters of Fine Arts from the University of Iowa and lectured for some years on creative writing at the San Francisco State University. She is currently Professor of English at the University at Buffalo. 

Timothy Yu places Kim in a group of Asian American poets at the close of the 20th century (also including John Yau and Mei-mei Berssenbrugge) who focused on "fragmentation, linguistic exploration, and cultural hybridity". Her work has been described as having the strongest influence on the direction of Asian American poetry throughout the 2000s.

When asked about her relationship with the English language, she said, "Language acquisition [...] has put on alert for me the way practices of language may contribute to producing hegemonic, normative cultural practices. As a poet I am constantly thinking about this intrinsic problem and exploring modes of relating to and generating language that pluralize sense-making."

Themes
According to Sueyeun Juliette Lee, Kim's literary method is driven by the idea that "the forces that have displaced and moved bodies across the globe become legible when we track the traces of the lives they touched." Lee also says that Dura, and much of Kim's work, demonstrates the motivated and partial nature of totalizing knowledge. Lee implies that Kim wants humans' actual relations to history and time recognized as more complex than notions like progress suggest.

Reviews
Edgar C. Knowlton, Jr. reviewed Dura positively in World Literature Today, claiming that "the poet has mastered the intricacies of English". In a review of Josephine Nock-Hee Park's Apparitions of Asia, Timothy Yu referred to Kim as one of the most challenging writers in the Asian American canon but also as a "major writer". Steven G. Yao of Hamilton College notes, however, that Asian American writers such as Li-Young Lee, Marilyn Chin, David Mura, Kimiko Hahn, and Timothy Liu have received more popular and scholarly attention than Kim.

In a review of Dura, Sueyeun Juliette Lee called her poetry "beautiful in its percussive, incisively unflinching attention to language, and also in its gentle envelopment of the slightest sentiments." A Publishers Weekly reviewer described Commons (2002) as her best book up to that point, saying the poems "[articulate] our often hidden and difficult ties to each other". Yu favorably compared Commons and Penury (2009) with her first collection Under Flag (1991), writing that "Kim has sharpened and broadened her political critiques in response to an evolving landscape of global capitalism, disaster, terror, and violence."

Works
Under Flag - Kelsey St. Press, 1991, reprinted. 1998 and 2008
The Bounty - Chax Press, 1996, reprinted. 2000
Dura- Sun & Moon Press, 1999
Spelt (with Susan Gevirtz) -  a+bend press, 2000
Commons - Berkeley: University of California Press, 2002
River Antes - Buffalo: Atticus/Finch, 2006
Penury - Omnidawn Publishing, 2009
Civil Bound - Omnidawn Publishing, 2019

Further reading
 
 Art and Culture. Myung Mi Kim
 BRINK Dean. Review: "Myung Mi Kim's The Bounty." in Interpoetics 1(1), Summer 1997. 
 JEON Joseph Jonghyun. "Speaking in tongues: Myung Mi Kim's stylized mouths. (Critical Essay)". Studies in the Literary Imagination, Spring 2004 v37 i1 p125a (24).
 LEE James Kyung-Jin. "Myung Mi Kim." Interview in Words Matter: Conversations with Asian American Writers. edited by King-Kok CHEUNG. Honolulu, University of Hawai'i Press, 2000. pp 92–104.
 MORRISON Yedda. "Generosity as Method: Excerpts from a Conversation with Myung Mi Kim." Interview in Tripwire: A Journal of Poetics, n°1. Fall 2000. pp 75–85.
 PARK Josephine Nock-Hee. "Composed of Many Lengths of Bone: Myung Mi Kim's Reimagination of Image and Epic." Transnational Asian American Literature: Sites and Transits. Editors: Shirley Geok-lin LIM, John Blair GAMBER, Stephen Hong SOHN, and Gina VALENTINO. Philadelphia, PA, Temple University Press, 2006. pp 235–256.
 SCHARF Michael and Jeff ZALESKI. "Forecasts: Poetry: Review of Myung Mi Kim's book Commons" Publishers Weekly, v 249, Issue 3, 21 January 2002, p 86.

External links
 Podcast-conversation between Myung Mi Kim and Kathryn Yusoff for Radio Web MACBA, 2022
 Interview and recital with Kim in 2000
 EPC Home Page
 UC Berkeley Lunch Poems Webcast
 Catalina CARIAGA's article "Desire and Predicament" from Poetry Flash, n°233, Aug. 1992 now available online at: 
 Ed PARK's "Sound Bitten: Commons by Myung Mi Kim" from the Village Voice Literary Supplement, New York, May 2002, at: 
 Jocelyn SAIDENBERG's "Review: Myung Mi Kim. The Bounty." ZERO: Writing Arts: 
 Zhou XIAOJING's article  "Possibilities Out of an Impossible Position: Myung Mi Kim's Under Flag". at: 
 Karl YOUNG's "Myung Mi Kim & Maureen Owen as of 1993". American Book Review 1993. at:

References

1957 births
Living people
South Korean emigrants to the United States
University of Iowa alumni
American writers of Korean descent
San Francisco State University faculty
University at Buffalo faculty